Adeline, Lady Molamure, CBE ( Meedeniya; 1890 – 1977) was the first female member of State Council of Ceylon, and therefore, the first elected female legislator in Sri Lanka. She was the Deputy President of the Senate of Ceylon.

Educated at Bishop's College, Colombo, she was the daughter of J.H. Meedeniya Adigar, member of the Legislative Council of Ceylon.

She was elected to the State Council by election in 1931 from her father's electoral seat after his death. She was later elected to the Senate in 1947 and was appointed as a Deputy President of the Senate in 1955. She was appointed a Commander of the Order of the British Empire in the 1955 Birthday Honours.

She was the daughter of J.H. Meedeniya Adigar, grandson of Humbadee Dissawa, who served under the last king of Kandy  and Cornelia Magdeline Senanayake, the daughter of Rev. Cornelius Senanayake, an Anglican priest and Corneliya Regina Obeysekere of Kataluwa Walawwa who was the sister of Lambertus Obeyesekere, Maha Mudaliyar.

Her sister was Alice Wijewardena who married D. R. Wijewardena (the founder of Lake House newspaper group) and her brother was Joseph Hercules Meedeniya who became the Rate Mahatmaya of Ratnapura, married Violet Ellawela. They had four children, which included Iranganie Serasinghe and Kamani Vitharana who married Professor Tissa Vitharana. Her sister's grandson Ranil Wickremasinghe would later become Prime Minister of Sri Lanka.

She was married to Sir Francis Molamure, the first speaker of the State Council and Parliament. Their only daughter Seetha Molamure was appointed a member of the Senate of Ceylon. She married L. J. Seneviratne a civil servant who became the Secretary of the Treasury.

See also
List of political families in Sri Lanka

References

1890 births
1977 deaths
Alumni of Bishop's College, Colombo
Ceylonese Commanders of the Order of the British Empire
Members of the Senate of Ceylon
Members of the 1st State Council of Ceylon
Sinhalese politicians
Women legislators in Sri Lanka
Wives of knights
20th-century Sri Lankan women politicians